Sincerely: Ever Dream is the 13th single by the Japanese band Dream as a trio. It reached number 19 on the weekly Oricon charts and charted for four weeks. This song also is a reworking of "Sincerely" from the group's album Dear..., with new lyrics by graduating member Mai Matsumuro. A promotional video was released on the Dream live 2002 Process DVD. The title song was used as the third ending theme to the anime Hikaru no Go. This single marks the graduation of the lead member Matsumuro and was released on her birthday, June 10.

Track list
 Sincerely: Ever Dream (original mix)
 Message (original mix)
 Message (instrumental)
 Sincerely: Ever Dream (instrumental)

Credits
 Lyrics: Mai Matsumuro
 Arrangement: Hal
 Music: Kazuhito Kikuchi

External links
 http://www.oricon.co.jp/music/release/d/478724/1/

2002 singles
Dream (Japanese group) songs
Songs written by Mai Matsumuro